The Temryuk War or Crimean-Circassian War of 1551–1556 was a military conflict between the Crimean Khanate and the Kabardian Principality.

History

Before the war 
Kabardian prince Temroqwa believed that the only way for Kabardian independence was to ally with Russia. Ivan the Terrible supported Temroqwa's goal to extend his power inside Circassia and to unify the lands of Circassians under his reign. Temroqwa established a fort in Mozdok that enabled the Circassian and Russian forces to perform joint training. Ossetian and Ingushetian lands, as well as the Turkic people, became subjects of the Kabardian raising power. Temroqwa’s expansion extended towards the Georgian kingdoms in the south.

The war 
In 1551, on the orders of the Ottoman Sultan, the Crimean Khan Sahib Giray undertook a campaign against the Circassians. The Crimean Tatars defeated the Hatuqway army and devastated the Bzhedug lands.

In 1553, A large Crimean Tatar horde led by Khan Devlet Giray entered the Kabardian lands. Huge destruction was made. However, the Crimeans could not gain a foothold in Kabarda, the Kabardians expelled them. In 1554, Devlet Giray led a new campaign against Kabarda.

In 1555, the Crimean horde "with all its might" attacked Circassians again. In repulsing the enemy, the Kabardians managed to inflict great damage on Khan Devlet Gerai, who retreated.

In 1556, the Crimean Khan Devlet Giray at the head of the Tatar horde moved again to Kabarda. Kabardians, warned in advance, met the enemy on the outskirts of their borders. Khan Devlet Giray was forced to retreat.

In 1556 Temroqwa led counterattack campaign against the Tatars. He managed to expel the Tatars from the Circassian lands and to chase the fleeing troops until Taman Peninsula. There, Temroqwa established the city which is now known as Temryuk. In 1569, in an attempt to push back the Russian forces, Tatar-Ottoman joint troops attacked the city of Astrakhan in the Khanate of Kazan. The joint troops were annihilated by a sudden attack from Temroqwa. Temroqwa kept his advance until north of the Don and established the city of known today as Novocherkassk (New Circassia) near Rustov.

References 

16th-century conflicts
16th century in the Crimean Khanate
Wars involving the Circassians
Military operations involving the Crimean Khanate